This Is the Time: The Christmas Album is an album by Michael Bolton, released on October 1, 1996. Bolton's first Christmas release, it contains two new songs: "This Is the Time" (performed with Wynonna Judd), and "Love Is the Power", while the others were covers of traditional Christmas songs. "Ave Maria" was performed with Spanish tenor Plácido Domingo. "White Christmas" was a single off the album Timeless: The Classics, but was also included on this album. The CD was an "enhanced" CD containing additional material viewable on a computer, including a video of "White Christmas", a discography, and a preview of a Bolton CD-ROM which was never released.

The album was released during Christmas time, narrowly missing the top 10 hitting #11. In United States the album was certified platinum.

Track listing
"Silent Night" (Franz Xaver Gruber, Joseph Mohr) – 4:06
"Santa Claus Is Coming to Town" (John Frederick Coots, Haven Gillespie) – 4:06
"Have Yourself a Merry Little Christmas" (Ralph Blane, Hugh Martin) – 4:02
"Joy to the World" (Lowell Mason, Isaac Watts) – 4:07
"Ave Maria" (with Plácido Domingo) (Traditional) – 4:42
"The Christmas Song" (Mel Tormé, Robert Wells) – 4:10
"O Holy Night" (Adolphe Adam, John Sullivan Dwight) – 4:54
"White Christmas" (Irving Berlin) – 3:44
"This Is the Time" (with Wynonna Judd) (Michael Bolton, Gary Burr) – 4:06
"Love Is the Power" (Walter Afanasieff, Bolton, Diane Warren) – 5:38

Certifications

References

Michael Bolton albums
1996 Christmas albums
Albums produced by David Foster
Albums produced by Walter Afanasieff
Christmas albums by American artists
Pop Christmas albums
Columbia Records Christmas albums